Forever is an American fantasy crime drama television series that aired on ABC as part of the 2014–15 fall television season.  Created by Matt Miller, it centers on the character of Dr. Henry Morgan, an immortal New York City medical examiner who uses his extensive knowledge to assist the New York City Police Department (NYPD) in solving crimes and to discover a way to end his immortality. Flashbacks within each episode reveal various details of Henry's life.

The series' network aired a sneak preview on September 22, 2014, and resumed the series at 10 p.m. EST on September 23, 2014.  Reception of the series was mixed.  In the United States, television critics were divided over the series' similarity to other crime dramas and its premise.  In contrast, voters in several online polls ranked the series as one of the best of the television season.  Forevers broadcast was well received in France and Spain.

Although ABC gave the series a full-season episode order on November 7, 2014, it cancelled Forever after one season.  ABC cited the show's low ratings as the rationale behind the decision.  Television critics believed that other factors explained the network's decision, as the show gained viewers who watched up to seven days later on their DVRs.  Fans of the series reacted strongly, creating a social media campaign to save the series; despite these efforts, the series remains canceled.

Premise
Dr. Henry Morgan (Ioan Gruffudd) is a New York City medical examiner who studies the dead for criminal cases, and to solve the mystery of his own immortality.

His first death was 200 years ago while trying to treat a slave as a doctor aboard a ship in the African slave trade; one of the ship's owners becomes frustrated with the time and effort Henry is putting into this and orders him to stop, shooting Henry and throwing him overboard when he fails to comply.  Each time he dies, Henry disappears almost immediately and returns to life naked in a nearby body of water, the only sign of injury being a scar at the site of his original gunshot wound from long ago. He has also stopped aging.  Henry's long life has given him broad knowledge and remarkable observation skills which impress most people he encounters, including New York Police Department Detective Jo Martinez (Alana de la Garza). Only antiquarian Abe (Judd Hirsch), whom Henry and his now-deceased wife Abigail found as a newborn in a German concentration camp during World War II, knows that he is immortal.

Henry is stalked by "Adam", who is also an immortal, and claims to have been alive for around 2,000 years.

Cast and characters

Main
 Ioan Gruffudd as Doctor Henry Morgan:
 Born in 1779, Henry is a New York City medical examiner who studies the dead for criminal cases and to solve the mystery of his immortality.  His first death was in 1814 while trying to free slaves as a doctor aboard a ship in the African slave trade in the Caribbean. Since that time, Henry disappears each time he dies and returns to life naked in a nearby body of water.  He has been married twice; his first wife Nora, whom he married before he became immortal, had him committed to an asylum, and his second wife, Abigail, whom he met during the Second World War and remained with until 1984, when she left to find somewhere they could be together without being judged for Abigail's apparently greater age. He abandoned his original career as a doctor in 1956 after he and a butcher were shot; Henry chose to crawl away and die instead of trying to save the other man because he feared others finding out his secret.  Although knowledgeable about many topics, Henry demonstrates a general lack of knowledge about modern popular culture. He also dislikes cell phones but will use one if necessary.
 Alana de la Garza as Detective Jo Martinez:
 Jo is a sharp, no-nonsense, determined detective with the NYPD who is both intrigued and disgusted by Henry's detailed medical knowledge when examining a corpse. She finds his behavior to be "out there", but still relies on his insight for solving homicides. Originating from a rough background with a law-breaking father, she is also a recent widow; her husband was a lawyer who died of an unexpected heart attack while running on a treadmill on a visit to Washington a year before she met Henry. She is stationed at the 11th Precinct.
 Joel David Moore as Lucas Wahl:
 Henry's assistant in the Medical Examiner's office, who expresses uncertainty about how little he knows about his boss, and an uncanny memory for his daily activities.  He studied film in college before working in the medical examiner's office. He makes horror films in his spare time; in the episode, "The Last Death of Henry Morgan", Lucas confesses to using the morgue as a set for several of his movies. Lucas tends to use popular culture references in his speech, many of which Henry does not understand.
 Donnie Keshawarz as Detective Mike Hanson:
 Jo's partner, who is stationed at the 11th Precinct. He was in a band when he was younger, a characteristic added at the request of AfterBuzz TV hosts Kate Aquillano, Marielou Mandl, and Pegah Rad and of fans of the series who watched the after show.  He is married and has two sons.  He also has a brother.  During an earlier interview with AfterBuzz TV, Keshawarz discussed Hanson's role as Henry's foil, namely Hanson's orthodox methodology in solving cases and knowledge accumulated over a limited lifetime contrasting with Henry's unorthodox ways and extensive knowledge gathered over a long life. This was particularly demonstrated in "The King of Columbus Circle", when both deduced that their victim had been suffering from cancer, Henry observing various tell-tale signs of chemotherapy such as stained hands and slight hair-loss while Hanson just noticed the medical alert bracelet the dead man was wearing. 
 Lorraine Toussaint as Lieutenant Joanna Reece: Jo and Hanson's supervisor at the 11th Precinct.
 Judd Hirsch as Abraham "Abe" Morgan:
 Henry's adopted son and main confidant. No one knows Dr. Henry Morgan better than his son, Abe. The keeper of Henry's immortality secret, although he has claimed that he worked with Henry's father to explain their association to strangers. At the end of World War II, he was rescued from Belsen, after surviving a death march from Auschwitz.  He currently owns an antique store where Henry uses the basement for his immortality research on himself. Abe fought in the Vietnam War and has a two-time ex-wife named Maureen Delacroix (Jane Seymour).  Abe's research into his family tree revealed that he is a distant relative of Henry's, as one of his ancestors was the illegitimate son of Henry's womanizing uncle.

Recurring

 MacKenzie Mauzy as Abigail Morgan:
Henry's second wife and Abe's adoptive mother. Henry met her toward the end of World War II when they were working as medical personnel near one of the Nazi concentration camps. Over the years, she worked as a nurse in addition to being a housewife. The latest time period in which Abigail has been shown is 1982, when she was still married to Henry but looked a generation older than he (Janet Zarish); in 1984, she vanished without a trace despite Henry's best efforts to find her. Henry has acknowledged that the end of his relationship with Abigail caused him a lot of pain that prevents him from dating anyone for whom he has real feelings. In the episode "The Night in Question", Henry learns from Adam that Abigail killed herself after a car crash to prevent Adam from finding Henry.  Abigail appears in ten episodes.
 Burn Gorman as Lewis Farber/"Adam":
A 2,000-year-old immortal who claims that he "has been here since the beginning" and that he has not found a death for himself.  Analysis of his blood revealed that he had contracted and recovered from several extinct diseases, including the bubonic plague. Adam was tortured as part of the Nazis' research into his immortality, leaving him with a hatred of the Nazis and a sympathy for other Holocaust survivors, including Abe. Adam first appeared as Henry's appointed psychiatrist and convinced a patient that he could pass on his immortality.  Adam continued to try to find a lost dagger, one that not only caused Adam's first death but also was used to kill Julius Caesar.  Adam appears in five episodes.

Episodes

Production

Origin
The concept for Forever came from a conversation between series creator Matt Miller and his five-year-old son about death. After the conversation, Miller began to imagine what life would be like if a person was immortal but everyone else, including that person's own children, were mortals.  He created a character who viewed immortality as a curse because of the pain of seeing family and friends die and who would attempt to find a way to end his immortality.  That concept informed Miller's decision to make his character a doctor-turned-medical examiner who used his occupation for research into his immortality and Miller's decision to structure the series as a procedural.  The details about the character's immortality and his ability and his desire to end it would serve as the series' main story arc.

Another series-long story arc explored how other people learn of Henry's immortality.  The first storyline in the arc was the season's second story arc, Henry's determination to learn the identity of a second immortal who knows about it. The second immortal character's morals would contrast his protagonist's morals, serving as an antagonist for the main character.  As for the family element, Miller created a family with a 35-year-old immortal having a mortal son in his 70s.  Miller stated in an interview with BuddyTV writer Catherine Cabanela that he had never seen that type of family on television before, and he believed that it provide the show with an emotional element.

To demonstrate Henry's immortality, Miller decided that Henry would die and would feel the pain every time he died. Anything on Henry's body would disappear with his body during each death. Miller felt that Henry's naked rebirth in water would be an interesting way to keep the show's protagonist alive during the series by completing the death and rebirth process; the nakedness would create several comedic moments within the series. Miller intended to use Henry's death and rebirth process sporadically after the first two episodes so that the series would focus on Henry's long life.

Casting
The first person cast was Judd Hirsch as Abe. When Miller and casting director Barbara Fiorentino developed a list of actors for the role, they felt that Hirsch would be the best actor to portray Abe. Hirsch was the first person asked about the role. When they sent the script to him,  Hirsch liked the series' premise, its historical aspect, its intelligence, and the idea that the audience would see life from Henry's perspective.

Two days after casting Hirsch, Ioan Gruffudd was cast as Dr. Henry Morgan.  Miller wanted the actors to read the script so that he could see whether the audience would believe that the man had been alive for over 200 years. The search for an actor to portray Henry was more difficult than Miller expected.  Miller and Fiorentino unsuccessfully auditioned actors from New York City, Los Angeles, Canada, London, Australia, and South Africa for the role, but the role was uncast. One day, Miller noticed Gruffudd in the carpool lane while they picked up their children from preschool.  For Miller, Gruffudd's period work, such as in the series Horatio Hornblower, made him an obvious selection for the role.  Gruffudd liked the script and felt that he could portray Henry.  The story, the science fiction element, and the believability also attracted Gruffudd to the role.

Alana de la Garza was cast as NYPD Detective Jo Martinez.  The show's procedural aspect, the series' serialized nature, and the believability of the world interested de la Garza.  She also liked the idea that, in contrast to de la Garza's characters on other procedurals, Jo had flaws.

Joel David Moore, Donnie Keshawarz, and Barbara Eve Harris were the last three cast for the series.  Harris was cast as NYPD Lieutenant Roark.  Originally the role of Lieutenant Roark was written as a male character, but Fiorentino cast Harris in the role.  Lorraine Toussaint replaced Harris after the pilot, and Toussaint's first appearance as Lieutenant Joanne Reece was in the episode "Look Before You Leap".  To prepare for her role, Toussaint visited the morgue and viewed a few autopsies.  The character of Lt. Reece was to play a larger role in the series, but her scenes were cut so that the episodes could fit time constraints.  The DVDs include the deleted scenes.

Moore was cast as assistant medical examiner Lucas Wahl.  Both Miller and Fiorentino knew Moore from his previous work with both of them.  Moore and Miller met when Moore guest starred on Miller's previous series Chuck.  Both Miller and Fiorentino, a personal friend of Moore's, discussed the pilot and the role with Moore.  Moore liked the idea of Lucas providing comedic moments to the series.  For Lucas' personality, Miller asked Moore to include several of his own personality traits when portraying Lucas.

Keshawarz as NYPD Detective Mike Hanson.  The casting department initially did not feel that Keshawarz could portray a NYPD detective, but his work on Homeland convinced them otherwise.  The Arkansas-raised Keshawarz imitated a New York accent for Forever.  As for the character's name, the writers did not give Hanson a first name until the fifth episode "The Pugilist Break" when Jo addressed Hanson as "Mike" during a scene.  Miller did not learn about the name until later when Keshawarz mentioned it to him in a conversation about the episode.

As for the recurring character of Henry's stalker Adam, Miller and Fiorentino cast Burn Gorman in the role. as Adam.  Gorman voiced the character during the pilot and the second episode. Adam made his first physical appearance in the episode "Skinny Dipper", which aired on December 9, 2014.

Writing
Beginning with the pilot, Miller structured each episode by telling two stories in the episode. The first was a traditional procedural plotline. The second story was a flashback from Henry's past. The flashback either related to the episode's main present-day storyline, such as Henry's involvement in investigating the Jack the Ripper case, or was a scene from Henry's backstory, such as his life in the Lower East Side's tenements in the 1890s. Both the father-son relationship between Henry and Abe and one of the two season-long story arcs, Henry's relationship with his wife Abigail, were told through flashbacks.

When planning an episode, the writers started with the idea for the episode and determined the main story arc. They discussed which plot element could be associated with a previous incident from Henry's life and how the flashbacks connected the two stories. From there, they determined Abe's viewpoint about the case or his connection to the case. Then, they planned the story on whiteboard.

One plot device used in the pilot, Henry's pocket watch, proved to be difficult to use in subsequent episodes. In the beginning, the writers would have Henry's pocket watch fall out of his pocket so that it would not disappear with the rest of his body. It became more difficult for writers to develop believable scenarios in which Henry would lose his watch, so they did not write it into the plot as frequently in later episodes.

Effects

Miller and the filming crew had planned to film the rebirth scenes in the pilot in several bodies of water, but they could film it in only one location.  During the episode's production, Gruffudd and the crew filmed the rebirth scene against a green screen in a university swimming pool due to the strength of the East River's current.  The crew later covered Gruffudd with water.  To depict Henry's death in different years, the crew refilmed the scene with Gruffudd wearing various hair styles.  The producers then edited the scene by superimposing the film of Gruffudd's swim in the pool with film of the East River to give the illusion that the scene occurred in the river.

Title dispute
Forever is also the title of a 2003 novel by writer Pete Hamill, with a similar premise: an Irishman is granted the gift of immortality by an African sangoma, yet must remain in Manhattan or the gift is renounced.  On May 21, 2014, Warner Bros. Television received a letter from RadicalMedia requesting that the name of the series be changed.  RadicalMedia stated in the letter that Miller's character, setting, and title were very similar to Hamill's.  The letter also stated that Sundance Studios had begun to develop a television series based on the novel.  According to Warner Bros. studio representatives, Miller never read the novel when developing Forever.  Hamill did not proceed with a lawsuit and died in 2020.

Reception
Forever received mixed reviews from critics in the beginning. Rotten Tomatoes gave the show a rating of 57%, based on 44 reviews, with an average rating of 5.8/10. The site's consensus stated, "Forever star Ioan Gruffudd is appealing, but his charm can't overcome the show's gimmicky, unrealized premise." Metacritic gave the show a score of 54 out of 100, based on reviews from 24 critics, indicating "mixed or average reviews".  TV Guides Matt Roush felt that the series could become a hit similar to Bones and Castle.  Other critics felt that the series had issues.  Zap2it.com's Sarah Huggins liked the concept for the series and Gruffudd's performance, but she felt that the first two episodes were inconsistent "in tone and story".  Both Varietys Brian Lowery  and Adweeks Sam Thielman believed that Forever  could not last as it faced CBS' Person of Interest in the 10 p.m. timeslot and as Forevers lead-in, Marvel's Agents of S.H.I.E.L.D., had dropped in the ratings during its first season.  Lowery also believed that the lack of answers about Henry's immortality could not sustain the series.  The Hollywood Reporters Tim Goodman concurred, feeling that the lack of answers about Henry's immortality could pose problems for viewers.  Still others felt that the series was a derivative of other series.  Brian Tallerico of RogerEbert.com felt that the series was a derivative of Sherlock Holmes.  Although Hillary Busis of Entertainment Weekly felt that Forever was a derivative of other procedurals, she stated that the show was "breezy and entertaining and reasonably clever, at least when its Sherlock Scanning isn't out of control" due to the performances of Gruffudd, de la Garza, and Hirsch and due to Miller's conceptualization of the series.

When Miller pitched the show to the various networks, network executives compared the series to New Amsterdam.  New Amsterdam, a short-lived drama which aired on Fox in 2008, featured a 400-year-old male NYPD detective and a female partner.   Miller stated that he had not heard about the series until he read some comments on an industry website.  Television critics also took notice of the similarities between New Amsterdam and Forever. USA Todays Robert Bianco thought that Forever took a "smarter, lighter approach to the subject" of immortality than New Amsterdam did.  Lowery, Roush, and Busis all noted the similarities between the two series in their reviews of Forever.

In France, Forever became an international hit.  The premiere on April 28, 2015 attracted 7.08 million viewers.  During the series' broadcast in France, Forever averaged an audience of about 5.7 million viewers, or 26.2% of the total French audience, making it France's most-watched series on Tuesday nights.  After the broadcast of the final episode, French fans of Forever joined English-speaking fans in their social media campaign to save the series.

When Forever premiered on Spain's Antena 3 on July 15, 2015, it drew 2,316,000 viewers.  Over the course of the series, Forever averaged over 1.679 million viewers, making it a successful series in Spain.  The series' success in spite of its cancellation in the United States prompted Rebeca Cortes of El Norte de Castilla to call Forever "the summer surprise".

The German paid-television channel Sat.1 Emotions began airing the first twelve episodes of Forever on February 3, 2015, but the series did not begin airing on Sat.1 on July 20, 2015.  The ratings fluctuated throughout the run from the 2.02 million viewers which watched the pilot, but ratings never dipped below 1.44 million viewers. During Forevers run in Germany, the series averaged 1.82 million viewers and a 6.3 percent audience share; the series' market share was lower than Sat.1's average. Among viewers between the ages of 14 and 49, however, the show averaged 0.96 million viewers and a 9.4 percent market share, which was near the network's average.

In 2016, TF1 began rebroadcasting Forever on July 23. Germany's kabel eins began its rebroadcast of Forever on September 23, 2016.

Awards and online polls
Forever has been nominated for three awards and has improved ranking in two online polls.  Forever received a nomination for "Best Primetime Television Program - Drama" category for the 30th annual Imagen Awards, but lost to Law & Order: SVU.  In TV Guides Fall TV Popularity Contest, Forever placed second, receiving 76% of TVGuide.com readers' votes.  It received a nomination in the "Favorite New TV Drama" category for the 2015 People's Choice Awards but lost to The Flash.  About 70.4% of voters in the E! Onlines "The Definitive Ranking of the Best and Worst New Shows—According to You" poll ranked the series the third best new show of the 2014–2015 television season.  When the poll was first conducted in November 2014, E! Online users voted Forever as the 17th worst new show of the season; the series received 60% of votes stating that the voters loved the series.

Broadcast history
On May 8, 2014, ABC announced that the network had picked up Forever for the 2014-2015 television season.  On July 15, 2014, the network announced that the series would have a two-day premiere, with the pilot airing on September 22 and the second episode debuting in the series' regular timeslot at 10 p.m. the next night.  Forever premiered in the United States on ABC on September 22, 2014.  Over 8.6 million viewers watched the episode live, and among adults 18–49, it had a 1.7 rating and a 5 share.  The episode also retained a larger percentage of total viewers and of adults 18–49 from its lead-in than Castles premiere on March 9, 2009; Castle kept 47% of total viewers and 49% of adults 18–49 while Forever kept 67% of total viewers and 77% of adults 18–49.  The second episode, airing the next night, was ABC's top-rated episode in that timeslot since September 21, 2010; it was viewed by 6.5 million people live and had a 1.7 rating and a 5 share.  Forevers second episode tied CBS' Person of Interest in adults 18–49 and beat the series in adults 18–34 and in women viewers.  The episode also kept all of its adults 18–49 audience from the pilot's debut the night before and increased the adults 18–34 audience by 8%.

After the first two episodes, however, the series' live ratings dropped significantly to about 5 million live viewers.  The Live+7-Day ratings, however, increased the audience by 3 million viewers, bringing the total audience to 8 million viewers weekly.  That, and Forevers performance in the 10 p.m. timeslot being better than ABC's performance in that timeslot during the 2013–2014 television season, convinced ABC to pick up additional episodes of the series.  Forever received a full-season order on November 7, 2014.

Forever airs a day before the U.S. on CTV in Canada. In the United Kingdom and Ireland, the show was acquired by Sky1. It premiered on October 2, 2014. The series premiered on Nine Network in Australia on February 11, 2015. In New Zealand, TV One debuted Forever on February 16, 2015.

Video on demand
On July 1, 2016, The CW announced that Forever was available to stream on the free digital-only network CW Seed.

Series cancellation
Before the season finale aired, Miller and the writers proposed the storyline for season two to ABC and to Warner Bros.  They pitched the idea of season two exploring the ramifications of Jo or another character, aside from Abe, learning about Henry's immortality, romance, and the pleasures associated with immortality.  They also planned to introduce several new characters to the series.  In an interview with Entertainment Weeklys Natalie Abrams, Miller stated that ABC appeared to like the direction of the show's second season.  On May 7, however, ABC announced the series' cancellation. Gruffudd's wife Alice Evans told fans about the cancellation on Twitter; Gruffudd posted a letter on Instagram detailing his reaction to the series' cancellation and thanking the show's fans for their support a few hours later.

In the meantime, Warner Bros. and Miller began to shop the series to other networks.  On July 7, Miller posted a letter to fans on Twitter stating that, as of that date, Warner Bros. had been unable to find another studio to produce the series and that the studio was still shopping it around to the networks. During a Twitter question-and-answer session on September 17, 2015, Miller revealed the characters that he wanted to introduce (biological children viewed in flashbacks), and that the character who would learn of Henry's immortality in season 2 was to be Lucas.

Officially, the network cited that Forevers live ratings was the main factor behind the series' cancellation. The pilot episode drew 8.26 million viewers live, but the finale drew 4.13 million live. On average, the series drew 4.93 million viewers live and a 1.12 adults 18–49 demographic weekly. In term of the Nielsen ratings' Live+7 Day ratings, Forever averaged 7.034 million viewers and drew a 1.7 adults 18–49 demographic. About 3.23 million people, or about 68% of Forevers audience, watched the series within seven days of the episodes original broadcast. Forever had the 19th-highest lift in total viewers for the 2014–2015 television season.  In addition, Forever had the 7th-largest increase in adults 18–49 from DVR viewing during the season. It was among the top 20 programs that received the largest increase in adults 18–49 within the first three days of viewing, and it received the 14th-highest increase in adults 18–49 from Live+3-Day to Live+7-Day viewing.

Television critics believed that live ratings was not the only factor in ABC's cancellation of Forever. The Orange County Registers Michael Hewitt and Adweeks Jason Lynch noted that several of ABC's other low-rated shows, in particular ABC's limited series American Crime, received renewals in spite of ratings that were similar to Forevers. American Crime had an average audience of 4.98 million viewers live and a 1.16 adults 18–49 demographic weekly; its Live+7 Day audience, however, averaged 6.697 million viewers and a 1.7 adults 18–49 demographic. Verne Gay of Newsday, Nellie Andreeva of Deadline Hollywood, and Stephen Battaglio of the Los Angeles Times pointed out that ABC renewed series produced by ABC Studios as a part of the network's decision to increase ownership of their series to compete with Netflix and Hulu.  Forever, produced by Warner Bros., was one of three cancellations for the network, the other two being Resurrection and Cristela. Kate Stanhope of The Hollywood Reporter and Matt Roush of TV Insider felt that Forevers time slot was a factor for the low ratings. Stanhope mentioned that Forever was airing opposite NBC's Chicago Fire and CBS' Person of Interest, both established series on their respective networks while Roush believed that Forever did not have a strong lead-in in. John Sica, a reporter for The Rockaway Times who had worked on the series, cited a lack of promotion and an inconsistent scheduling of episodes during Forevers run as factors that led to the series cancellation.

Fan reaction
Before the series' cancellation, Forever placed fourth in USA Todays 18th annual "Save Our Shows" poll.  When ABC announced the cancellation of Forever, fans were outraged, and some left angry messages on ABC's Facebook page.  Using the hashtag #SaveForever, others began a social media campaign on Facebook and Twitter to save the series.  An online petition on Change.org generated over 6,500 signatures within two days of being created, and it generated over 12,600 signatures in three days.  By May 27, it had generated nearly 27,000 signatures.  Some have had requested that Netflix or another network take over the production of the series.  By November 5, 2015, the petition generated 107,150 signatures.

The cancellation generated a discussion on social media.  When TVLine posted a story about the cancellation, it generated 2,175 comments, making it the third most talked-about story in the site's five-year history.  About 43.70% of Entertainment Weekly online readers voted it as the most-missed cancellation in Entertainment Weeklys online poll.

A fan-made, non-profit, unofficial graphic novel, titled "Forever & Ever!", debuted on Facebook on January 5, 2016.  According to one of the comic series' co-creators, the novel expands the fictional universe created by Miller by introducing new material and new characters.

Ratings

In Australia, the first episode was watched by 619,000 viewers, making it the fourteenth most-watched broadcast that night. The second one was viewed by 522,000 viewers, making it the twentieth most-watched. In Canada, the first and second episodes received 2.32 and 1.57 million viewers, respectively. In the United Kingdom, the premiere garnered 847,000 viewers, making it the highest-rated broadcast on the network that week. In New Zealand, it was the third most-watched broadcast in prime time that night, with 243,650 viewers.

Home video releases
Miller revealed that Warner Bros. would release DVDs for the series during a Twitter question-and-answer session on September 17, 2015.  On November 16, 2015, Warner Home Entertainment of Canada announced that DVDs for the series would be released on January 19, 2016. That day, Warner Bros. announced it would be made available in the United States through the company's Warner Archive Collection as a manufacture-on-demand title.  The DVD contained all 22 episodes of the series on five discs, along with deleted scenes from many of the episodes. The Region 4 DVD was released on February 3, 2016.

Streaming
The series is available to stream on The CW's streaming service, The CW.

See also 
 New Amsterdam (2008 TV series)—a crime drama also set in New York City with a similar premise
 Harrow (2018) - another series starring Ioan Gruffudd as a pathologist.

References

External links
 
 

2014 American television series debuts
2015 American television series endings
2010s American crime drama television series
2010s American medical television series
2010s American mystery television series
2010s American science fiction television series
American Broadcasting Company original programming
American fantasy television series
English-language television shows
Fiction about immortality
Fictional portrayals of the New York City Police Department
Television series by Warner Bros. Television Studios
Television shows set in New York City
Television shows filmed in New York (state)